Gailliard is a surname. Notable people with the surname include:

Amos M. Gailliard Jr. (1928–2014), United States Army officer
James Gailliard (born 1965), American pastor and politician
Louis Gailliard (1912–1996), French hurdler

See also
Gaillard (disambiguation)
Galliard (disambiguation)